Manasanamaha is a 2020 Indian Telugu-language non-linear romantic drama short film written and directed by Deepak Reddy. It is produced by Gajjala Shilpa starring Viraj Ashwin and Drishika Chander. 

The film was screened at various film festivals and received many accolades as well as being Oscar(Academy Award)-qualified and BAFTA-qualified. The film was officially entered into the Guinness World Records for the Most Awards won by a Short Film in May 2022. The film was critically acclaimed and received praise for its story, performances and direction.

Plot 
Surya (Viraj Aswin) is a young man who narrates the story about his three past love relationships. Each story's love interest represent three different seasons, which are Chaithra (summer), Varsha (rainy) and Seetha (winter). The three names represent his three past partners. The film is narrated in a reverse manner. Every scene goes backwards to the starting point from the ending.

Cast 

 Viraj Ashwin as Surya
 Drishika Chander as Chaithra
 Valli Raghavender as Varsha
 Prithvi Sharma as Seetha
 Bunny Abhiran as Surya's friend
 Baby Sahasra
 Satya Varma
 Deepak Varma
 Mahesh

Production 
The film is Reddy's third short film. It was with a production budget of US$5000. The film was shot in 5 days but had an excessive pre-production and post-production work. Deepak's team designed 2D animated storyboards so that the crew had no ambiguity in what to execute.

Reception 
123telugu.com wrote that "The production values, performance, narration, and especially the reverse camera shots have made this short film a talking point. Young director Deepak has surely made a mark in Tollywood."

Taryll Baker of ukfilmreview in his review about the film wrote that "Manasanamaha is a perfect display of the greatness of world cinema, and how talented these filmmakers are. In terms of concept, it’s fairly straightforward. But on a technical level, this short film raised the bar. Manasanamaha is a fantastic, stunning, colourful and uplifting film, not to be missed. Several scenes shift from a point-of-view perspective, back to the usual ‘fourth wall.’ It's these shifts, paired with the reverse effect that makes Manasanamaha so inviting and engaging. There's a lot of creativity oozing from every frame, not only visually but musically, too."

Adva Reichman of Cult Critic wrote that "The cinematic choices elevated the script. The shots were exact, and were used perfectly while toying with our expectations, the camera work was impeccable and precise, and the acting was on point and endearing, thus making the overall outcome worth your time and attention."

Film threat's Alan Ng wrote that "I loved this short film. It’s smart and insightful…and it comes from my guy’s perspective. It’s honest enough to admit that we have our own hangups and foibles when it comes to the other sex. There’s an animation element that I’m not sure was needed, but a solid short film all around with the scenes in reverse as its highlight. Manasanamaha is a production from India, but the challenges of finding love are universal."

Accolades

Official selections & Awards

References

External links 

 Official website

2020 films
2020 short films
Indian short films
2020s Telugu-language films
2020 romantic drama films
Films shot in Hyderabad, India
Indian romantic drama films
Indian nonlinear narrative films